The Baby may refer to:

 The Baby (song), 2002 single by Blake Shelton
 The Baby (film), 1973 American psychological thriller film directed by Ted Post
 The Baby (TV series), 2022 British horror comedy limited series
 The Baby (Samia album), 2020 album by Samia

See also 
 The Babys, 1970s British band
 The Babies, American band
 Baby (disambiguation)